The Laguna Salada Fault is a geological fault between the United States and Mexico.

Earthquakes

1892

According to some seismologists the 1892 Laguna Salada earthquake ranks among the largest earthquakes in California and Baja California in historic times. It occurred on 23 February 1892, and was centered near Laguna Salada in Baja California.

2010

The Laguna Salada Fault is thought to be the origin of the 2010 Baja California earthquake.  Prior to this, the fault had not produced a major earthquake for over 100 years, since 1892.

Faults
The Laguna Salada Fault is a probable southern continuation of the Elsinore Fault Zone in Southern California.  These faults are considered to be secondary cohorts of the San Andreas Fault, and as such share some of the strike-slip motion between the North American Plate and the Pacific Plate.

References

Seismic faults of California
Seismic faults of Mexico
Strike-slip faults
Geology of Imperial County, California
Geography of Baja California
Geography of Imperial County, California
Natural history of Baja California
El Centro metropolitan area
Mexicali Municipality